The Syrian Emergency Task Force (SETF) is a United States-based, 501-C(3) organization established in March 2011 to support the Syrian opposition.  SETF advocates in solidarity with the Syrian rebels to inform and educate the American public and its representatives about their struggle.

The organization's primary focus is those still inside Syria suffering from the colossal humanitarian crisis. In 2016, SETF opened a school for orphans, the Wisdom House, in the Northern Idlib Province of Syria and in August 2017 expanded the school to include a Women's Center and High School for girls called "Tomorrow's Dawn". SETF seeks to promote the development of the Syrian civil society based on respect from human dignity and freedom.

In the United States, the focus of the Syrian Emergency Task Force is advocacy on behalf of the Syrian opposition to the American government and bringing awareness to the American people. Their aim is to protect the innocent civilians caught in the war and put pressure on the Syrian government whether that be through advocating for U.S. military support in the Syrian Civil War, congressional office visits, media awareness campaigns, and organizing briefings for key U.S. foreign policy decision-makers. The Syrian Emergency Task Force was instrumental in the drafting and passage of the Caesar Syria Civilian Protection Act.

Staff
Executive Director: Mouaz Moustafa. Moustafa is a former field organizer for the U.S. Democratic National Committee and previously served as executive-director of the Libyan Council of North America.

Director of Advocacy: Veronica Zanetta-Brandoni
Director of Humanitarian Programs: Natalie Larrison
Director of Development: Abby Straessle
Director of Detainee Affairs: Omar Alshogre

Political Advocacy: The Caesar Act
The Syrian Emergency Task Force (SETF) works in close partnership with the Caesar Team and the former Syrian military photographer, code-names Caesar, who smuggled 55,000 photographs out of Syria. These brutal images, known as the Caesar file, have been verified by the FBI's International Human Rights Unit (IHRU).  The cache of photos documents the systemic mass murders and atrocities carried out inside Assad regime prisons.

In 2014, the Syrian Emergency Task Force arranged for Caesar to testify before the House Foreign Affairs Committee. This testimony, as well as support from SETF, prompted the drafting and later passage of the Caesar Syria Civilian Protection Act, also known as the Caesar Act. The Caesar Act garnered bi-partisan support; House Foreign Affairs Committee Chairman Eliot L. Engel and Ranking Member Michael T. McCaul, Senate Foreign Relations Committee Chairman James Risch and Ranking Member Bob Menendez, Rep. French Hill (AR-02), and Rep. Kinzinger (IL-16) are among some of the U.S. officials that have applauded the efforts of the Caesar Act and the Caesar Team.

The Caesar Act sanctions the Syrian regime, including Syrian President Bashar al-Assad, for war crimes against the Syrian population.  Not only was SETF pivotal in the drafting and passing of the Caesar Act, but the organization currently works alongside the United States State Department to implement Caesar Act sanctions and bring justice for the Syrian people.

In March 2020, the Syrian Emergency Task Force coordinated another Congressional hearing. Caesar, Omar Alshogre, and Raed Al Saleh (of the White Helmets (Syrian Civil War)) testified before the Senate Foreign Relations Committee as to the importance of the Caesar sanctions implementation.   They spotlighted the ongoing injustice and crimes against humanity carried out by the Assad regime.

The Syrian Emergency Task Force, in their partnership with the Caesar team and renowned experts of international humanitarian law, including the United States Holocaust memorial museum, U.S. War Crimes Ambassador Stephen Rapp, and international lawyers, pursue legal prosecutions of war criminals all over the world using the Caesar file and material witnesses as evidence.

Programs
The Wisdom House School: SETF connects communities in the United States to sustain a Kindergarten for orphans, The Wisdom House, and a women’s center in war-torn Idlib Province in Northwestern Syria.

Rukban Camp: SETF provides life-saving aid to civilians trapped in Rukban Camp for internally displaced persons.

Victims Support: SETF supports survivors of torture in Assad regime detention facilities, witnesses, and their families who are key in bringing legal cases against Assad regime war criminals.

Letters of Hope: SETF connected people in the United States to internally displaced people, mostly children, in Syria through a letter-writing campaign.

SETF officials - including Moustafa - have been widely cited in media reports on the Syrian Civil War and have been influential in advising United States policymakers on issues related to Syria. According to the group, SETF staff have held meetings with more than two-thirds of the membership of the U.S. Congress and have organized junkets for members of congress to visit selected regions in northern Syria.

Syrian Emergency Task Force has worked with Americans for a Free Syria and Syrian American Council before for similar objectives.

See also

 2014 Syrian detainee report
 Caesar Syria Civilian Protection Act
 Human rights in Syria
 Syrian American Council
 U.S. Holocaust Memorial Museum
Omar Alshogre, SETF's Director of Detainee Issues

References

Further reading

Organizations of the Syrian civil war
Political advocacy groups in the United States